Esoterica is an over-the-counter topical ointment applied to the skin for the purpose of lightening freckles, age spots, chloasma, melasma, and other skin discolorations due to a benign localized increase in the production of melanin.  Esoterica may have other appropriate medical uses as determined by a physician.

Active and inactive ingredients 

The active ingredients of Esoterica are: 
 hydroquinone (2.0%), Octyl Dimethyl PABA (3.3%), and benzophenone 3 (2.5%);

The inactive ingredients are:
 water, glyceryl monostearate, isopropyl palmitate, ceresin, light mineral oil, PEG 6 32 stearate, poloxamer 188, propylene glycol, stearyl alcohol, steareth 20, laureth 23, allantoin ascorbate, sodium bisulfite, steareth 10, dimethicone, fragrance, methylparaben, sodium lauryl sulfate, propylparaben, trisodium EDTA, and BHA.

See also
Dermatology
Hydroquinone
Skin whitening

External links
 Esoterica described at Drugs.com
 Esoterica cream described at Drugs.com
 Active and inactive ingredients listed at Drugstore.com

Ointments